An Airman's Letter to His Mother (1941) is a documentary-style British propaganda short film based on an actual letter from a British bomber pilot to his mother published in The Times in June 1940. Subsequently, the letter was published as a pamphlet and received wide distribution in the UK. "The letter in question had touched a nation's heart and made a popular film subject." In 1941, Michael Powell directed An Airman's Letter to His Mother, based on a dramatization of the letter, and narrated by John Gielgud.

Premise
A Royal Air Force (RAF) airman who dies during a mission has left a letter to be sent to his mother upon his death. The letter is delivered to his mother. As the letter is read out by his mother in the airman's room, she looks through his things and remembers him as a youth. The letter tells of his reasons for joining the air force and going to fight, knowing full well that he could die.

Production
Although An Airman's Letter to His Mother was not produced by the British Government, and was Powell's personal contribution to the war effort, the film had many of the hallmarks of "official" war films of the period. These films should explain: "What Britain is fighting for, including contrasting British values with Nazi Germany's values; how Britain fights and the need for sacrifice if the fight is to be won."

British propaganda films in Second World War also were in sharp contrast with the more racially tinged and strident examples from warring nations, especially Nazi Germany and the Soviet Union. Most often, British films were topical, informative and "entertaining or amusing." In the case of An Airman's Letter to His Mother, the subject was the reading of a real letter left by an airman for his mother. John Gielgud reads the letter in a voiceover; the actress playing the part of the mother is unknown. Her face is not visible and she never speaks.

Historical accuracy

The author of the letter
The author of the letter has subsequently been revealed to be Flying Officer Vivian Rosewarne, the co-pilot of a Vickers Wellington bomber, stationed at RAF Marham, Norfolk. The 23-year-old flyer was killed during the Battle of Dunkirk in May 1940. Rosewarne's death notice was eventually published on 23 December 1940.

Rosewarne was an only son whose early years were spent in Brentwood where he attended Brentwood School.

On 30 May 1940, a force of 17 Wellington bombers from RAF Marham took off to provide close ground support to the British Expeditionary Force as they withdrew from the beaches of Dunkirk. Aircraft R3162 from No. 38 Squadron RAF was shot down near the town of Veurne in Belgium and the six-man crew were killed. On 31 May 1940, the co-pilot, Flying Officer Vivian Rosewarne, was reported missing, believed killed.

This is the text of the loss report and crew disposition:

Rosewarne and his crew were laid to rest at Veurne Communal Cemetery Extension (West Vlaanderen Belgium).

Publication
His station commander, Group Captain Claude Hilton Keith, found a letter among the missing airman's personal possessions. It had been left open, so that it could be passed by the censor. Keith was so moved by the letter that, with the mother's permission, it was anonymously published in The Times on 18 June 1940.

The letter

Reaction to the letter
The Times was inundated with over 10,000 requests for copies of the letter in the first few days after publication. The letter was subsequently published in a small book, illustrated by Thomas Derrick, by The Times Publishing Company Ltd. (as An Airman's Letter to His Mother) and reprinted three times. By the end of the year, over 500,000 copies had been sold. King George VI wrote personally to the mother. In the United States the book was reprinted 12 times by E.P. Dutton & Co.

Suggestions that the letter was fictitious and a propaganda device eventually led to the identification of Flying Officer Rosewarne with his death notice finally published on 23 December 1940. A portrait of Flying Officer Rosewarne (painted from his mother's photographs) by Frank O. Salisbury was unveiled on 18 September 1941 and although his mother attended, she wished to remain anonymous desiring to be known only as "the mother of the young unknown warrior."

Rosewarne's letter continues to inspire and his letter features in the RAF's publication Leadership. His portrait is displayed at Brentwood School and a copy at Cranwell.

The following pictures of Rosewarne come from his Commanding Officer Group Captain C. H. Keith's personal copy of the published book and are published here for the first time.

Reception
Film critic Tony Williams reviewed An Airman's Letter to His Mother, characterizing the work as an example of Powell's creative style, "... this five-minute short contains several examples of supreme visual composition and touching narration. They often transcend its original purpose as a work of British wartime propaganda making it far more compelling and enduring than Powell’s contribution to the now dated and unwatchable The Lion Has Wings (1939), which he does mention in his recollections."

References

Notes

Citations

Bibliography

 Butler, Susan. East to the Dawn: The Life of Amelia Earhart. Reading, Massachusetts: Addison-Wesley, 1997. .
 Lazar, David, ed. Michael Powell: Interviews. Jackson, Mississippi: University Press of Mississippi, 2013. .

External links
 An Airman's Letter to His Mother reviews and articles at the Powell & Pressburger Pages
 
 

1941 films
1940s English-language films
British aviation films
British World War II propaganda shorts
British black-and-white films
Films about shot-down aviators
Films by Powell and Pressburger
Films directed by Michael Powell
1940s war films
British war films